Ysgol Gymraeg Bro Morgannwg (previously Ysgol Gyfun Bro Morgannwg) is a Welsh medium comprehensive school in the town of Barry in the Vale of Glamorgan, on the coast of south Wales. It is located adjacent to Barry Hospital.

The school was established in September 2000, in what was formerly the Lower School of Barry Comprehensive School. By 2002, there were 24 teachers and 369 pupils in year 7 to 9 at the school. A quarter of the pupils came from homes where one parent could speak Welsh, and 6% came from homes where both parents could speak Welsh. The school won over 7 awards at the Urdd National Eisteddfod in 2017, and is typically successful for its all-round talents in all fields.

Alumni
 Sion Jones (rugby league, born 1997), rugby league player for Halifax RLFC and Wales
 Lloyd Williams, rugby union player for Cardiff Blues and Wales
 Cory Allen, rugby union player for Cardiff Blues and Wales 
 Steffan Jones, rugby player for Wales 7s
 Wes Burns, football player for Ipswich Town and Wales
 Dafydd Smith, rugby player for Wales 7s 
 Mason Grady, rugby union player for Cardiff Rugby, Wales U20's and Wales 6 Nations squad 2023 
 Morfydd Clark, Actress
 Annes Elwy, Actress

References

External links
Ysgol Gymraeg Bro Morgannwg website

Secondary schools in the Vale of Glamorgan
Bro Morgannwg
Educational institutions established in 2000
Barry, Vale of Glamorgan
2000 establishments in Wales